Willy Gervin (28 November 1903 – 8 July 1951) was a Danish cyclist who competed in the 1932 Summer Olympics. He won a bronze medal in the tandem event.

References

1903 births
1951 deaths
Danish male cyclists
Olympic cyclists of Denmark
Cyclists at the 1932 Summer Olympics
Olympic bronze medalists for Denmark
Olympic medalists in cycling
Cyclists from Copenhagen
Medalists at the 1932 Summer Olympics